Pheidole neokohli is a species of ant in the subfamily Myrmicinae. It is endemic to the Democratic Republic of the Congo.

References

neokohli
Hymenoptera of Africa
Insects of the Democratic Republic of the Congo
Endemic fauna of the Democratic Republic of the Congo
Insects described in 1984
Taxa named by E. O. Wilson
Taxonomy articles created by Polbot